Janez Pišek may refer to:

 Janez Pišek (footballer, born 1911), Slovenian football player and manager
 Janez Pišek (footballer, born 1998), Slovenian football player